Villasanta may refer to:

Villasanta, a comune (municipality) in the Province of Monza and Brianza in the Italian region Lombardy, located northeast of Milan
Elvie Villasanta (died 2013), Filipino comedian